Sergey Nikolskiy is a Soviet sprint canoer who competed in the mid to late 1970s. He won five medals at the ICF Canoe Sprint World Championships with four golds (K-1 4 x 500 m: 1973, K-4 10000 m: 1977, 1978, 1979), and a silver (K-4 1000 m: 1977).

References

Living people
Soviet male canoeists
Year of birth missing (living people)
Russian male canoeists
ICF Canoe Sprint World Championships medalists in kayak
Honoured Masters of Sport of the USSR